The 2009 Danmark Rundt was a men's road bicycle race held from 29 July to 2 August 2009. It was the 19th edition of the men's stage race, which was established in 1985. The race was won by Danish rider Jakob Fuglsang of Team Saxo Bank, making this his second consecutive victory in the race. Maurizio Biondo of Ceramica Flaminia finished second by just three seconds with Roger Hammond of Cervélo third.

Schedule

Teams
Fifteen teams took part in the 2009 race. Team Columbia–HTC was due to compete but withdrew as it was unable to field a team.

Final classifications
Danish rider Jakob Fuglsang won the race by three seconds from Maurizio Biondo after a solo victory in stage 3 on the Kiddersvej climb in Vejle. Although Biondo was able to contest the race on the individual time trial, Fuglsang was able to maintain his lead on the final stage. Roger Hammond was placed third.

The points winner was Matti Breschel with Troels Vinther the winner of the mountains classification for best climber. Rasmus Guldhammer won the white jersey for the best young rider award and Allan Johansen was awarded the fighters award for the race. Team Saxo Bank won the overall team competition by seven seconds from Cervélo with Team Capinordic in third place.

References

Danmark Rundt
Danmark Rundt
Danmark Rundt